John R. Hanesiak (born June 23, 1941) is a Canadian former curler. He played second on the 1972 Brier Champion team (skipped by Orest Meleschuk), representing Manitoba. They later went on to win the World Championships in Garmisch-Partenkirchen of that year.

References

External links
 
 John Hanesiak – Curling Canada Stats Archive
 Canadian curler who hacked a dart in '72 says he quit after seeing himself on TV | CBC Radio
 
 
 Video: 
 
 

Brier champions
1941 births
Living people
Curlers from Manitoba
World curling champions
Canadian male curlers